A pelvic tumor is any one of numerous tumors that occur in the pelvis.  Within the pelvis, these tumors may involve specific organs, or occupy intra-organ spaces.  Tumors of the presacral space and sacral space are most prevalent in children.  Tumors occupying specific organs have a more complex natural history.

Tumors occupying specific organs
Bladder cancer
Prostate cancer
Rectal cancer
Anal cancer
Ovarian cancer
Uterine cancer
Sacrococcygeal teratoma

Tumors occupying intra-organ spaces

Presacral space:
Teratoma

Sacral space (in approximate order of prevalence):
Teratoma
Lipoma
Ganglioneuroma
Myxopapillary ependymoma
Primitive neuroectodermal tumor
Aneurysmal bone cyst
Ewing's sarcoma
Metastases from brain stem tumors (medulloblastoma, ependymoma, high-grade astrocytoma)

Complications
Urinary incontinence
Fecal incontinence

References

Types of neoplasia